KSRW (92.5 MHz, TV-33. "Sierra Wave") is a radio station broadcasting a Classic Rock music format and features programming from Westwood One.  The station is rebroadcast on 96.5 at Mammoth Lakes on translator K223BF, which in turn feeds another rebroadcast on 92.5 at Mammoth Mountain on translator K243AK. The station is also rebroadcast to central Mono County on translator K243BC on 96.5 FM from Conway Summit, CA  KSRW also ran KSRW-LP, channel 33, broadcasting Local News and featuring programming from Outside Television, licensed to Mammoth Lakes, California. KSRW-LP signed off on analog channel 33 at 6:20 am PDT on July 13, 2021. Sierra Wave Television was on Channel 3 until August 2022 on Suddenlink. Licensed to Independence, California, USA, the KSRW 92.5 radio station serves the Bishop, Ridgecrest, Mammoth Lakes and June Lake areas. The station is currently owned by licensee Benett Kessler II Trust, which is owned by investors.
KSRW flipped to the Alternative Rock format on September 6, 2015, after having an adult contemporary format for many years and then to Classic Rock in May of 2022.

References

External links
 
 KSRW Live Radio Stream (Tunein.com)
 

SRW
Inyo County, California